Poul Højmose is a Danish football manager and former player. He is the former manager of the Denmark women's national team. Højmose was the first full time coach for the national team.

Personal life

Højmose is married to Susan Mackensie, a former footballer who he coached at Hjortshøj-Egå. In 2004 the couple were living in Højbjerg with their two daughters.

References

Danish men's footballers
Women's association football managers
Danish football managers
Denmark women's national football team managers
Elitedivisionen managers
Association football forwards
Year of birth missing (living people)
Living people